Matt Joyce (born March 30, 1972 in La Crosse, Wisconsin) is a former American football guard and tackle in the National Football League for the  Seattle Seahawks, Arizona Cardinals and Detroit Lions. He played college football at the University of Richmond.

Early years
Joyce attended New York Military Academy where he practiced football, basketball and track. He was an All-Conference defensive lineman.

He accepted a scholarship from the University of Richmond, where he was a three-year starter at defensive tackle.

Professional career

Dallas Cowboys
Joyce was not selected in the 1994 NFL Draft and was signed as an undrafted free agent by the Dallas Cowboys, with the intention of converting him into an offensive lineman.

He was waived on August 28, but after being claimed by the Cincinnati Bengals and not passing their physical, he was signed to the Cowboys practice squad.

Seattle Seahawks
On March 1, 1995, he signed as a free agent with the Seattle Seahawks and started the first 13 games at left guard. He was released on August 25, 1996.

Arizona Cardinals
On December 2, 1996, he signed as a free agent with the Arizona Cardinals. At the end of the season, he was assigned to the Scottish Claymores of the World League of American Football (WLAF).

The next year, he started the last 6 games at left guard, after missing the first 7 games with a sprained knee. In 1998, he was a backup and special teams player.

In 1999, he started 9 games at left tackle and the last 6 at left guard, after L. J. Shelton was moved into the starting lineup. The next year, he started 13 games at left guard and was inactive 3 games with a back injury.

Detroit Lions
On April 26, 2001, he signed as a free agent with the Detroit Lions. He started 11 games at right tackle and one at left guard. The next year, he started 3 games at right tackle and 3 at left guard. In 2003, he started the last 3 games at left guard in place of an injured Eric Beverly

He was released on April 21, 2005, to make room for Kyle Kosier.

References

1972 births
Living people
Sportspeople from La Crosse, Wisconsin
Players of American football from Wisconsin
American football offensive guards
American football offensive tackles
Richmond Spiders football players
Seattle Seahawks players
Arizona Cardinals players
Detroit Lions players
Scottish Claymores players
New York Military Academy alumni